Jochen Lettmann (born 10 April 1969, in Duisburg) is a German slalom canoeist who competed in the 1990s. Competing in two Summer Olympics, he won a bronze medal in the K1 event in Barcelona in 1992.

Lettmann also won two medals in the K1 team event at the ICF Canoe Slalom World Championships with a gold in 1995 and a bronze in 1997. He also has two medals from the 1996 European Championships in Augsburg (a team gold and an individual bronze).

World Cup individual podiums

References

1969 births
Canoeists at the 1992 Summer Olympics
Canoeists at the 1996 Summer Olympics
German male canoeists
Living people
Olympic canoeists of Germany
Olympic bronze medalists for Germany
Olympic medalists in canoeing
Medalists at the 1992 Summer Olympics
Sportspeople from Duisburg
Medalists at the ICF Canoe Slalom World Championships